Quyquyhó (Guaraní: Kuykuyho) is a town in the Paraguarí department of Paraguay.

Location
It is located in the southern region of the Paraguarí Department. It is approximately 169 km away from the Paraguayan capital city, Asunción.

How to get there

From Asunción you have to take the National Route Number 1 (Ruta Uno) until you reach Caapucú, where you have to take a detour on your left to the town of Quyquyhó.

Demography
This district is 624 km² big, and according to the 2002 National Census, Quyquyhó has a total population of 6,865 inhabitants and its urban has only 798 inhabitants.

Notable people
Aníbal Lovera, composer and singer

Sources 
World Gazetteer: Paraguay – World-Gazetteer.com

Populated places in the Paraguarí Department